Düsseldorf-Rath Mitte is a railway station situated at Rath, Düsseldorf in western Germany. It is served by the S6 line of Rhine-Ruhr S-Bahn. Interchange to Stadtbahn line U71 and Tram line 701, both operated by the Rheinbahn, is possible.

References 

Railway stations in Düsseldorf
S6 (Rhine-Ruhr S-Bahn)
Rhine-Ruhr S-Bahn stations
Railway stations in Germany opened in 1967